Zlatko Georgiev Yankov (born 7 June 1966) is a Bulgarian footballer manager and former player, who played as a midfielder.

Career
Yankov was capped 79 times and scored four goals for the Bulgaria national team between 1986 and 1999. He played eight games wearing the no.6 shirt at the World Cups in 1994 and 1998, and he was also in the Bulgarian Euro 1996 squad.

Levski Sofia Zlatko Yankov was the Bulgarian player who gave the last pass to Yordan Letchkov for Bulgaria's second winning goal against world champions Germany during their clash in the 1994 World Cup quarterfinals. At club level, he was part of the famous Levski team from the 1990s, which eliminated Scottish club Glasgow Rangers in 1993. His nickname is "Фара" (The Lighthouse).

Career statistics
Scores and results list Bulgaria's goal tally first, score column indicates score after each Yankov goal.

Honours
Levski Sofia
 A Group: 1992–93, 1993–94, 1994–95
 Bulgarian Cup: 1990–91, 1991–92, 1993–94

Beşiktaş
 Turkish Cup: 1997–98
 Turkish Super Cup: 1998

Bulgaria
FIFA World Cup: fourth place 1994

References

External links
 Profile at LevskiSofia.info

1966 births
Living people
Bulgarian footballers
Association football midfielders
Bulgaria international footballers
Bulgaria youth international footballers
1994 FIFA World Cup players
1998 FIFA World Cup players
UEFA Euro 1996 players
Real Valladolid players
La Liga players
Neftochimic Burgas players
FC Chernomorets Burgas players
KFC Uerdingen 05 players
PFC Levski Sofia players
FC Lokomotiv 1929 Sofia players
Gençlerbirliği S.K. footballers
Beşiktaş J.K. footballers
Adanaspor footballers
Vanspor footballers
First Professional Football League (Bulgaria) players
Süper Lig players
Bundesliga players
Bulgarian expatriate footballers
Bulgarian expatriate sportspeople in Turkey
Expatriate footballers in Turkey
Bulgarian expatriate sportspeople in Germany
Expatriate footballers in Germany
Bulgarian expatriate sportspeople in Spain
Expatriate footballers in Spain
Sportspeople from Burgas